Janice Patricia "Jan" Lehane O'Neill OAM (née Lehane; born 9 July 1941) is a former Australian female tennis player. She was the first leading female player with a double-handed backhand.

She won the singles title at the New South Wales Championships in 1959 after a three-sets victory in the final against Mary Carter Reitano. In 1960, she successfully defended her title by winning the semifinal against world No. 1 ranked Maria Bueno and the final in straight sets against Margaret Smith.

At the Australian Championships, Lehane reached the singles final four consecutive years (1960–1963) but lost to Margaret Smith each time. She had a similar experience in women's doubles, reaching the final twice (in 1961 with Mary Bevis Hawton and 1963 with Lesley Turner Bowrey) but losing each time to a team that included Smith (with Mary Carter Reitano in 1961 and Robyn Ebbern in 1963). Lehane had more success in the mixed doubles, twice winning the title (in 1960 with Trevor Fancutt and 1961 with Bob Hewitt). However, Mike Sangster and Lehane lost the 1964 mixed doubles final to Smith and Ken Fletcher.

She had an operation on her right knee in January 1965 and did not play any of the Grand Slams that year.

She was part of the Australian Fed Cup team that reached the final in 1963 and won all three of her singles rubbers.

According to Lance Tingay of The Daily Telegraph and the Daily Mail, O'Neill was ranked in the world top 10 in 1960, 1963, and 1964, reaching a career high of World No. 7 in 1963.

Lehane married James John O'Neill on 19 February 1966.

In 2018, she was inducted into the Australian Tennis Hall of Fame.

On Australia Day 2019, Jan was awarded the Medal of the Order of Australia (OAM) for her service to tennis.

Grand Slam finals

Singles (4 runners-up)

Doubles: (3 runners-up)

Mixed doubles (2 titles, 1 runner-up)

Grand Slam singles tournament timeline

Note: The Australian Open was held twice in 1977, in January and December.  O'Neill participated only in the January edition.

See also 
 Performance timelines for all female tennis players who reached at least one Grand Slam final

References

External links
 
 
 

Australian Championships (tennis) champions
Australian female tennis players
1941 births
Living people
Grand Slam (tennis) champions in mixed doubles
Grand Slam (tennis) champions in girls' singles
Tennis people from New South Wales
Australian Championships (tennis) junior champions